Steve "Chippa" Lekoelea (born 5 February 1979 in Sebokeng, Gauteng as Steve Motsiri) is a South African football (soccer) midfielder who played for Premier Soccer League clubs Moroka Swallows, Orlando Pirates and South Africa.

Career
He was 15 years, 257 days old when he debuted for Moroka Swallows in 1994, and became the league's youngest scorer, aged 16 years, 7 days, when he scored against Umtata Bush Bucks on 12 February 1995. Lekoelea was playing under the name of Steve Motsiri at the time.

Lekoelea first appeared for the senior South Africa national football team as a teen.

Previous clubs: Maritzburg United, Orlando Pirates, Moroka Swallows, Mbabane Highlanders
Bafana Bafana caps won: 10

References

External links

1979 births
Living people
People from Sebokeng
South African Sotho people
South African soccer players
South Africa international soccer players
Association football midfielders
Moroka Swallows F.C. players
Orlando Pirates F.C. players
Platinum Stars F.C. players
Maritzburg United F.C. players
Footballers at the 2000 Summer Olympics
Olympic soccer players of South Africa
2000 African Cup of Nations players
Sportspeople from Gauteng